Francis James Hurst  was an Irish Anglican priest in the late nineteenth and early twentieth centuries: he was Archdeacon of Clogher from 1903 until 1906.

Hurst was educated at Trinity College, Dublin  and ordained in 1859. He served curacies at Trory and Tydavnet. He was the incumbent at Clabby from 1873 until 1906.

References

Archdeacons of Clogher
Alumni of Trinity College Dublin
20th-century Irish Anglican priests
19th-century Irish Anglican priests